Matthew Wells OAM (born 2 May 1978 in Hobart, Tasmania) is a field hockey defender from Australia, who was a member of the team that won the gold medal at the 2004 Summer Olympics in Athens by beating title holders The Netherlands in the final. Four years earlier, when Sydney hosted the Summer Games, he finished in third spot with The Kookaburras, as the Men's National Team is called. He had to miss the 2006 Men's Hockey World Cup due to injury.

External links

 Profile on Hockey Australia

1978 births
Australian male field hockey players
Olympic field hockey players of Australia
Male field hockey defenders
Olympic gold medalists for Australia
Olympic bronze medalists for Australia
Field hockey players at the 2000 Summer Olympics
2002 Men's Hockey World Cup players
Field hockey players at the 2004 Summer Olympics
Field hockey players at the 2006 Commonwealth Games
Field hockey players at the 2008 Summer Olympics
Recipients of the Medal of the Order of Australia
Sportspeople from Hobart
Living people
Commonwealth Games gold medallists for Australia
Medalists at the 2000 Summer Olympics
Medalists at the 2004 Summer Olympics
Medalists at the 2008 Summer Olympics
Commonwealth Games medallists in field hockey
Olympic medalists in field hockey
Medallists at the 2006 Commonwealth Games